Vice Admiral Sir Roderick Douglas Macdonald KBE (25 February 1921 – 19 January 2001) was Chief of Staff of Naval Home Command.

Naval career
Educated at Fettes College, Macdonald joined the Royal Navy in 1939. He saw action during World War II during the Norwegian Campaign. After the War he commanded various ships and was mentioned in dispatches for actions against EOKA. Between 1965 and 1966 he commanded naval forces in Borneo. During the early 1970s he commanded HMS Bristol.

In 1973 he was appointed Chief of Staff Naval Home Command and then in 1976 he became Chief of Staff of Allied Naval Forces Southern Europe at NATO. He retired in 1979.

Later career
In retirement he became a distinguished artist and retired to his home on the Isle of Skye where he was chieftain of the annual Highland games. In 1993, his book 'The Figurehead' was published detailing his early war time career in the Royal Navy . He is buried in Portree cemetery on Skye.

References

Royal Navy vice admirals
Knights Commander of the Order of the British Empire
1921 births
2001 deaths
People educated at Fettes College
British military personnel of the Indonesia–Malaysia confrontation
British military personnel of the Cyprus Emergency
Royal Navy officers of World War II
British expatriates in Indonesia